The Book of Zephaniah  (Ṣəfanyā; sometimes Latinized as Sophonias) is the ninth of the Twelve Minor Prophets, preceded by the Book of Habakkuk and followed by the Book of Haggai. Zephaniah means "Yahweh has hidden/protected," or "Yahweh hides".  Zephaniah is also a male given name.

Authorship and date 

The book's superscription attributes its authorship to "Zephaniah son of Cushi son of Gedaliah son of Amariah son of Hezekiah, in the days of King Josiah son of Amon of Judah," All that is known of Zephaniah comes from the text.

The name "Cushi," Zephaniah's father, means "Cushite" or "Ethiopian," and the text of Zephaniah mentions the sin and restoration of Cushim. While some have concluded from this that Zephaniah was dark-skinned and/or African, Ehud Ben Zvi maintains that, based on the context, "Cushi" must be understood as a personal name rather than an indicator of nationality. Abraham ibn Ezra interpreted the name Hezekiah in the superscription as King Hezekiah of Judah, though that is not a claim advanced in the text of Zephaniah.

As with many of the other prophets, there is no external evidence to directly associate composition of the book with a prophet by the name of Zephaniah. Some scholars, such as Kent Harold Richards and Jason DeRouchie, consider the words in Zephaniah to reflect a time early in the reign of King Josiah (640–609 BC) before his reforms of 622 BC took full effect, in which case the prophet may have been born during the reign of Manasseh (698/687–642 BC). Others agree that some portion of the book is postmonarchic, that is, dating to later than 586 BC when the Kingdom of Judah fell in the Siege of Jerusalem. Some who consider the book to have largely been written by a historical Zephaniah have suggested that he may have been a disciple of Isaiah because of the two books' similar focus on rampant corruption and injustice in Judah.

Purpose 

If Zephaniah was largely composed during the monarchic period, then its composition was occasioned by Judah's refusal to obey its covenant obligations toward Yahweh despite having seen Israel's exile a generation or two previously—an exile that the Judahite literary tradition attributed to Yahweh's anger against Israel's disobedience to his covenant. In this historical context, Zephaniah urges Judah to obedience to Yahweh, saying that "perhaps" he will forgive them if they do.

Themes 

The HarperCollins Study Bible supplies headings for the book as follows:

More consistently than any other prophetic book, Zephaniah focuses on "the day of the Lord," developing this tradition from its first appearance in Amos. The day of the Lord tradition also appears in Isaiah, Ezekiel, Obadiah, Joel, and Malachi.

The book begins by describing Yahweh's judgement. The threefold repetition of "I will sweep away" Zephaniah in 1:2–3 emphasizes the totality of the destruction, as the number three often signifies complete perfection in the Bible. The order of creatures in Zephanaiah 1:2 ("humans and animals ... the birds ... the fish") is the opposite of the creation order in Genesis 1:1–28, signifying an undoing of creation. This is also signified by the way that "from the face of the earth" forms an inclusio around Zephaniah 1:2-3, hearkening back to how the phrase is used in the Genesis flood narrative in Genesis 6:7, Genesis 7:4, and Genesis 8:8, where it also connotes an undoing of creation.

As is common in prophetic literature in the Bible, a "remnant" survives Yahweh's judgement in Zephaniah by humbly seeking refuge in Yahweh. The book concludes in an announcement of hope and joy, as Yahweh "bursts forth in joyful divine celebration" over his people.

Later influence
Because of its hopeful tone of the gathering and restoration of exiles,  has been included in Jewish liturgy.

Notes

References

Further reading 
 Berlin, Adele. Zephaniah: A New Translation with Introduction and Commentary. The Anchor Bible Volume 25A. Toronto: Doubleday, 1994.
 Easton's Bible Dictionary, 1897.
  Transcribed by Thomas M. Barrett. 2003.
 Hirsch, Emil G. & Ira Maurice Price. "Zephaniah." JewishEncyclopedia.com. 2002.
 LaSor, William Sanford et al. Old Testament Survey: the Message, Form, and Background of the Old Testament. Grand Rapids: William B. Eerdmans, 1996.
 O. Palmer Robertson. The Books of Nahum, Habakkuk, and Zephaniah (New International Commentary on the Old Testament, 1990)
 Sweeney, Marvin A. Zephaniah: A Commentary. Ed. Paul D. Hanson. Minneapolis, Fortress Press, 2003.

External links 

 Zephaniah at JewishEncyclopedia.com

Translations of the book of Zephaniah

Jewish translations:
 Tzefaniah – Zephaniah (Judaica Press) translation [with Rashi's commentary] at Chabad.org
Christian translations:
Online Bible at GospelHall.org (ESV, KJV, Darby, American Standard Version, Bible in Basic English)
 Zephaniah at CrossWalk.com (various versions)
 Zephaniah at The Great Books (New Revised Standard Version)
 Zephaniah at Wikisource (Authorized King James Version)
Non-affiliated translations:
 The Heavenly Fire: Zephaniah (PDF) (Creative Commons translation with in-depth introduction and extensive translation notes)
  Various versions

 
7th-century BC books
Twelve Minor Prophets